Micheline Bernard (born May 15, 1955) is a Canadian actress. She is most noted for her performances in the films Small Blind (La mise à l'aveugle), for which she received a Jutra Award nomination for Best Actress at the 15th Jutra Awards in 2013, and Matthias & Maxime, for which she won the Prix Iris for Best Supporting Actress at the 22nd Quebec Cinema Awards in 2020.

Born and raised in Quebec City, she is a 1977 graduate of the Conservatoire d'art dramatique de Québec.

Her other roles have included the films Les yeux rouges, 8:17 p.m. Darling Street (20h17 rue Darling), It's Not Me, I Swear! (C'est pas moi, je le jure!), Crying Out (À l'origine d'un cri), King Dave and A Brother's Love (La Femme de mon frère), the television series Radio Enfer, Diva, Ramdam, Tactik, Unité 9 and Entre deux draps, and roles on stage.

She is the cousin of actor Denis Bernard.

References

External links

1955 births
20th-century Canadian actresses
21st-century Canadian actresses
Canadian film actresses
Canadian stage actresses
Canadian television actresses
Actresses from Quebec City
French Quebecers
Living people
Best Supporting Actress Jutra and Iris Award winners